Girma Seifu (Ge'ez: ግርማ ሰይፉ (Säyfu); born 1971) is a member of the Ethiopian House of People's Representatives. Girma was born in Mesalemia area in Addis Ababa, Ethiopia.

Life

Girma followed elementary class until grade 8 at Yekatit 23 School and completed high school in Medihanialem School. He then joined Addis Ababa University where he obtained a bachelor's degree and a master's degree  in economics. After graduation, he joined the Federal Auditor General, where he was exposed to civil service work. He also worked in Ethiopian Social Rehabilitation and Development Fund, a World Bank-financed project and was also among employees who worked to establish the National HIV/AIDS Secretariat, which was also a World Bank-financed project.

Political career

Girma is a member of the Ethiopian House of People's Representatives where he is the sole occupant of an opposition seat in the parliament. He has said he would not run in the 2015 elections and his party would not field candidates.

On 3 August 2018, Girma was promoted to the new Government Privatisation Advisory Council to advise Prime Minister Abiy Ahmed concerning his new economic reforms.

Girma has contributed two books on Ethiopian Politics. The first one ``የነፃነት ዋጋ ሰንት ነው?` How much Freedom Cost? and “የተከበሩት I”  በሕወሓት/ኢህአዴግ ፓርላማ `The Honerable’s` In Side the TPLF/EPRDF Parliament. The first book on his biography and the tough road traveled during 2005 election. It tell us how to win election. The second book is focused on the up and downs of Ethiopian Parliament Stay especially the personalities of the members in the parliament. Both books have his political perspective in controversial issues in Ethiopian politics.

Girma is an active social media person and weekly contributor to the well-known weekly Magazine Fithe//ፍትሕ.

References

21st-century Ethiopian politicians
1950 births
Living people
Members of the House of Peoples' Representatives
People from Addis Ababa